Gritz may refer to:

People

 Bo Gritz (born 1939), US Army Special Forces officer

Other
 Watermelon, Chicken & Gritz, a 2002 musical album by the rap sextet Nappy Roots
 Gritz Blitz, a nickname for the 1977 Atlanta Falcons defense that allowed the fewest points per game (9.2) in NFL history